Cristian David Gil Hurtado (born 5 November 1996) is a professional footballer who plays as a forward for Primera División club FAS. Born in Colombia, Gil represents El Salvador at international level.

International career
Gil scored his first goal for El Salvador in a 2–1 2022 FIFA World Cup qualification loss to Costa Rica.

Personal life
Hailing from a footballing family, Cristian Jr. is the son of former Colombian footballer Cristian Gil, as well as the brother of both Brayan Gil and Mayer Gil.

Career statistics

Club

Notes

International

International goals
Scores and results list El Salvador's goal tally first, score column indicates score after each El Salvador goal.

References

1996 births
Living people
Footballers from Cali
Salvadoran people of Colombian descent
Naturalized citizens of El Salvador
Salvadoran footballers
El Salvador international footballers
Colombian footballers
Association football forwards
C.D. Atlético Marte footballers
C.D. Chalatenango footballers
A.D. Isidro Metapán footballers